Towson may refer to:

Places
In the United States:
Towson, Maryland, an unincorporated community in Maryland
Towson Center, one of Towson University's sports arenas
Towson Square, an outdoor mall
Towson Town Center, a shopping mall
Fort Towson, Oklahoma, a community in Oklahoma
Fort Towson, a historical military fort in the old Indian Territory in Oklahoma
Towson County, Choctaw Nation, in the Indian Territory

People with the surname
Nathaniel Towson (1784–1854), United States Army officer
Toby Towson, American gymnast and dancer

Schools
Towson High School, in Baltimore County, Maryland
Towson University, a public university in Baltimore County, Maryland
Towson Catholic High School, a former school in Baltimore County, Maryland

See also

Tonson (surname)